The Härzlisee is an artificial lake in Obwalden, Switzerland. It was created to serve the tourist area of Brunni.

See also
List of lakes of Switzerland

References

External links

Lakes of Obwalden
Engelberg
Reservoirs in Switzerland
Lakes of the Swiss Alps